NRG, acronym for New Radiancy Group (Hangul: 엔알지), was a South Korean pop music group. Originally a five-member boy band consisting of Chun Myung-hoon, Lee Sung-jin, Noh Yoo-min, Moon Sung-hoon, and Kim Hwan-sung, NRG debuted in 1997 and underwent sporadic periods of activity and hiatus between 2000 and 2008 before going on an extended hiatus. In 2017 they regrouped as a trio to celebrate the 20th anniversary of their debut and released an extended play.

Members

Past members
 Lee Sung-jin (Hangul: 이성진) – leader, vocals (1997-1999; 2001–2006; 2017–2018)
 Chun Myung-hoon (Hangul: 천명훈) – vocals, rap (1997-1999; 2001–2006; 2017–2018)
 Noh Yoo-min (Hangul: 노유민) – vocals (1997-2006; 2017–2018)
 Moon Sung-hoon (Hangul: 문성훈) (1997-2005)
 Kim Hwan-sung (Hangul: 김환성) (1997-2000; died 2000)

Timeline

History

1996: Formation
Lee Sung-jin and Chun Myung-hoon originally debuted in 1996 as duet under the name HamoHamo and released one album with moderate success from the singles, "Papillion" and "Pangpang". Moon Sung-hoon and Noh Yoo-min originally backup dancers for HamoHamo. They were discovered by music producer Kim Tae-hyung (ko). Due to the success of the five-member idol group H.O.T, Kim Tae-hyung decided that they should become a four-member dance group. Kim Hwan-sung, who had previously been part of a quartet called Kkaebi Kkaebi and then a project group with Shoo of S.E.S. and Son Ho-young and Danny Ahn of g.o.d, was later added to the line-up.

1997–1999: Debut, breakthrough and line-up changes
NRG debuted on October 28, 1997, on the cable music program Music Tank (ko) with the single "I Can Do It" (할 수 있어). Two weeks after their debut, the group held an MC spot for ten weeks on the show. Their first album New Radiancy Group sold over 200,000 copies in South Korea. At the 1998 SBS Popular Song Awards, NRG won the New Face Award (Best Male New Artist). According to H.O.T members Moon Hee-joon and Tony An, they had initially considered NRG their professional rival rather than Sechs Kies as NRG introduced acrobatic stunts into their choreography, which was considered groundbreaking at that time.

NRG's second album Race was released that same year, and featured more high energy dance songs like "Messenger", selling over 300,000 copies in South Korea. With the second album, NRG was also able to find success outside of Korea, selling albums in both China and Japan. NRG became the first South Korean musical group to actively market themselves in China, where they have sold over 100,000 copies. Today, NRG is widely credited as one of the pioneers of the Korean Wave (Korean Hallyu) that first swept through Asia in the late 1990s.

In 1999, Lee left the group to pursue a career in acting and hosting, while Chun took a less visible role in the group by choreographing their dance routines and writing and composing rather than performing. They released their third album, NRG 003 as well as a Christmas album that year titled Kiss In Christmas.

2000-2001: Kim Hwan-sung’s death, Sorrow, and temporary hiatus
Tragedy struck when Kim died suddenly of a virus infection on June 15, 2000. He had been admitted to the hospital on June 6 but his condition quickly deteriorated to the point where he was placed on life support. The members went on a one-year hiatus to mourn his death and considered disbanding permanently at one point.

NRG's fourth album Sorrow (悲) was released in 2001 with the title track written for them by H.O.T. member Kangta. In August 2001, NRG held their first concert in Korea, paying tribute to Hwan-sung by performing "Good Bye My Friend" and "Antonio" (Hwan-sung's nickname) which was written and composed by Myung-hoon.

2002–2005: Return with Hit Song, first number-one song, New Radiancy 6 Group, and Sung-hoon's Departure
Almost four years after the death of Kim Hwan-sung, NRG returned with their fifth album Hit Song in 2003. The lead single "Hit Song" earned the group their first ever #1 win on a music program. They were also named in the Teen's Choice Top 10 Singers (ko) at the MBC Gayo Daejejeon music awards. During the ceremony, the members dedicated their win to Kim.

In 2004, NRG released their sixth album New Radiancy 6 Group. The title track placed 4th in the pop charts as the World Cup neared, and was fitting for the occasion. However, the song, "Hurray For A Virile Son Of Korea" did not chart. Soon afterward, Moon announced his departure for unspecified reasons and remained out of the public eye for over a decade; he appeared on the SBS show Star Couple (ko) with his wife in 2012 and revealed that they had a son, although they have since divorced. NRG promoted as a three-member group once again.

2005–2015: One of Five and temporary disbandment
In 2005, the now three-member NRG released their seventh album One of Five but it was not as successful. They decided to go on hiatus as two members would be beginning their mandatory military service. Lee withdrew from the group permanently as he was being investigated over a gambling scandal. Noh and Chun eventually decided to go their separate ways.

Lee left the entertainment industry and stayed out of the public eye for personal reasons. Noh ventured into business and made sporadic appearances on various variety shows, including Handsome Boys of the 20th Century which starred Chun and four other fellow first-generation idol group members. Chun released a digital single and stayed active in the entertainment industry. NRG's debut single "You Can Do It" was remade by the cast of Handsome Boys of the 20th Century and the new version charted on the Gaon Digital Chart.

2016–2018: Reunion
On October 22, 2016, NRG held a fan meeting and announced that NRG would be getting back together with all the members except for Moon, although they stayed in contact with him throughout the years. On September 27, 2017, it was announced NRG would participate in the 2017 Dream Concert, marking their first performance since their disbandment 11 years ago. On October 19, the first teaser images were revealed. One week later, it was revealed the track and the new album, 20th Century (20세기), were released under Genie Music. 20th Century charted in the Gaon Album Chart, peaking at #39.

In March 2018, Moon joined the other NRG members on the talk show Video Star. It was the first time in thirteen years all four members were on television together and, for the first time in over fifteen years, publicly spoke about how Kim's death had affected them. Lee, Chun and Noh also appeared on the MBC documentary series Human Documentary: Good People (ko) and met up with Kim's parents.

Musical style and influences
NRG is considered to be the pioneers of dance pop in the K-pop industry and their repertoire has been described as "high energy dance music". Their songs notably sample elements of Eurobeat and electronic music. They are also the earliest known K-pop group to incorporate acrobatic stunts into their choreography.

Discography

Studio albums

Compilation albums

Live albums

Extended plays

Singles
 "I Can Do It" (할 수 있어) (New Radiancy Group)
 "Breakfast at Tiffany's" (티파니에서 아침을) (New Radiancy Group) 
 "Making Love" (사랑만들기) (Race) 
 "Messenger" (Race)
 "You! Me!" (NRG 003)
 "Face" (NRG 003)
 "Sorrow" (비) (Sorrow)
 "Hit Song" (Hit Song)
 "Friend" (친구) (Hit Song) 
 "Hurray for a Virile Son of Korea" (대한건아 만세) (New Radiancy 6 Group)
 "A Bonus Book" (One of Five)
 "20th Century Night" (20th)
 "On the Phone: Clean Ver." (통화 중)
 "Line Is Busy"
 "Go to the Pyeongchang"

Awards

Mnet Asian Music Awards

See also
List of South Korean idol groups (1990s)

References

External links
 NRG profile on EPG 
 NRG profile on empas people 
 Music Factory Entertainment 

South Korean boy bands
South Korean dance music groups
Musical groups established in 1997
Musical groups disestablished in 2006